Rick and Morty Go to Hell is a limited series graphic novel, written by Ryan Ferrier, illustrated by Constanza Orozo, and colored by Sarah Stern, which was published in five parts in 2020 by Oni Press, as an epilogue to The Rickoning, the twelfth and final volume of the first ongoing comic series based on the franchise by Justin Roiland and Dan Harmon, while also serving as an alternate reality sequel to the television series episode "Something Ricked This Way Comes" by Mike McMahan. Tonally described as "Dante's Inferno meets Office Space", Part One was released on April 29; Part Two was released on May 27; Part Three was released on June 24; Part Four was released on September 23; and Part Five was released on October 21 (all in 2020). The series' demonic visions of Rick and Morty were later made available as playable characters in the free-to-play role-playing video game Pocket Mortys.

Receiving a generally positive critical reception, the series will be republished in April 2023 as the first volume of Rick and Morty Deluxe Double Features, an omnibus with Ever After by Sam Maggs and Sarah Stern & Emmett Helen.

Overview
Based on the same multiple timeline concept as described in the Rick and Morty first season episode "Close Rick-counters of the Rick Kind", Rick and Morty Go to Hell follows the alternate universe Smith family from The Rickoning as they descend into Hell after the destruction of their parallel universe at the hands of the Rickluminati's universe-destroying bomb, with no memory of their deaths. As the family separately explore the realm, Summer attempts to find true love, Jerry unwittingly inspires a revolution, and Rick remains in denial as Morty attempts to reach and make a deal with the Devil, Lucifer Morningstar / Lucius Needful (from "Something Ricked This Way Comes").

Premise

Part One
Well, it finally happened. Following The Rickoning, Rick and Morty are in Hell, and we don't mean the DMV. It's fire, brimstone, and torture for all eternity. Typical Rick, he sees a way out of this mess and drags Morty with him on a horrific adventure to speak to…the manager.

Part Two
Having filed an appeal with the dark lord almighty, Rick and Morty must begin the treacherous paperwork: enduring circles of Hell leading to the devil himself. First up, Rick and Morty must endure the ultimate regret and shame of a life well-lived…well, lived anyways.

Part Three
Rick and Morty must face horrors of their past within the digestive tract of an unfathomable beast. Meanwhile, a mutiny in Hell begins a brewin' and it's all Jerry's fault, because, of course.

Part Four
Nearing the end of their journey through Hell, Rick and Morty must face their greatest challenge yet, one that will reveal the true nature of their souls. Can our titular heroes overcome the Devil's task before Hell collapses under civil war?

Part Five
Rick and Morty are finally face to face with ol' Lucifer himself, but the hordes of Hell want to cut in line. Can Rick and Morty successfully appeal their case, or are they doomed to suffer for all eternity? The shocking conclusion to Rick and Morty Go to Hell!

Development
While Oni Press' original contract to publish an ongoing comic book series based on the animated series Rick and Morty expired after five years with the publication of the final issue of The Rickoning in March 2020, announced as the conclusion of the series and brand as a whole, Oni Press signed a new contract for a succession of limited-run series from different writer/illustrator teams, beginning with Rick and Morty Go to Hell, an epilogue series to The Rickoning following its alternate reality Rick, Morty, and Smith family as they find themselves in Hell following their deaths (and the destruction of their universe) at the end of The Rickoning. Announced in January 2020, to be written by Ryan Ferrier and illustrated by Constanza Oroza, with a premise of "Dante's Inferno meets Office Space", Ferrier described the series as "some of the best comedy I've [ever] written. And I’ve always had a propensity for writing comedy, and especially satire. I think it's really fun [to bring] a ridiculous amount of laughs [to] the realm of fire and brimstone", further elaborating on "wreak[ing] havoc in the Rick and Morty sandbox [as] a total thrill", describing his collaboration with Oroza as forming a "phenomenal, equally twisted team [to make] weird, irreverent, and most importantly, funny comics," finally summarising the affair as "Mad science fiction and devil business are two of my favorite things, and we're taking extreme joy in throwing these characters into the figurative and literal fires. Rick and Morty are going to Hell, and we're taking you down with us!". To promote the series, two different covers drawn by Brian Smith were made available, along with an "insane" variant cover limited to 1,000 copies by Zé Burnay made available through Oni's website in the "Exclusive Editions" section of their store.

Reception

Comics XF lauded the overall narrative of Go to Hell for "only get[ting] sharper and more interesting as Rick and Morty trawl Hell's depths", in particular bringing attention to the "remarkable thing from a storytelling standpoint [in] that all of the characters [except Beth have something to do [in] Rick and Morty both mak[ing] some emotional breakthroughs as they react to their various tortures, Jerry tr[ying] to rally the denizens of the underworld against Rick[,] and Summer learn[ing] that courtship is hell everywhere… especially in Hell", concluding to say the "narrative depth [of the series] stacks up nicely to any of the show’s episodes and is right there with the best of [Kyle] Starks’ run" — the "apex" of A Tale of Two Jerries.

Aaron Phillips of But Why Tho? praised the "dialogue heavy[,] rip-roaring, existential debate [had by Rick and Morty while they traverse the rocky terrain of [the] afterlife", with writer Ryan Ferrier having "done justice to the opening issue in the series by laying the foundations for the plot by having Rick and Morty essentially on opposite ends of the spectrum as they tackle this abstract concept. The joy of the story is in the intelligence of the discussion between the two characters[…] Morty serv[ing] as a good narrative instrument for the visuals we see in the panels [and] Ferrier really test[ing] the limits of Rick’s rationality throughout the issue by throwing obstacle after obstacle, but then counteracts it with a level of reasoning, mixed with a level of disdain at the mere mortals that surround him, that would definitely come from someone with the intellect of Rick Sanchez", in addition to praising the consistency of Oroza's artwork and Stern’s coloring. Tanner Dedmon of ComicBook.com similarly complimented the series as "a pretty generic Rick and Morty adventure" with a "perfect use of the Rick and Morty formula".

Lucas Fashina of Comic Crusaders lauded Go to Hells continuation of the television series' themes of Rick Sanchez's conflicting views on the existence of God, alternating from openly expressing atheism to recognising (but not respecting) the existence of God and the Devil, not respecting either, but nonetheless fearing death, and the conflicting options of an abyss over Hell, describing the character's initial denial of his damnation as "puzzling", praising Constanza Oroza's "pretty good" art style while expressing disappointment at a general lack of Easter Eggs, while Jody Cardona of Monkeys Fighting Robots praised "Oroza['s] fantastic job of capturing the feel of the original series while adding extra details." On the resolution of the fifth and final issue of Go to Hell "wrap[ping] up with a bang", Jesse Bereta of Bubbleblabber called it "the stand-out piece of the series. If one were to skip the rest of the books and just read this conclusion, it would be better, and likely still make sense[…] deserv[ing] the recognition of being a good read on its own".

Elvie Mae Parian of WomenWriteAboutComics criticised the series as being "pretty run-of-the-mill when it comes to any other Rick and Morty story" in spite of its "fiery premise", describing Constanza Oroza's art as "spot on, perfectly translating the animated series' house style in this comic form with a looser interpretation that is mostly accurate to our familiarity with this cartoon cast. [Sometimes] slightly off-model, but in a way that is intentionally dynamic to add freneticism to the still images" while comparatively complimenting it in comparison to writer Ryan Ferrier's previous work on Teenage Mutant Ninja Turtles Universe and Mighty Morphin Power Rangers. Stephen Schleicher and Robert Mammone similarly described the series as being as "competently done" as The Simpsons Comics, praising "Ferrier [as having] the characters down pat. Their dialogue, their reactions, all fit[ting] with what we’ve seen in the series", in particular an "astonishing juxtaposition of Morty [Smith]'s self-involved lament, with a moment of true mourning [among] stand out laugh lines" in a rendition of "Amazing Grace", positively compared to former U.S. President Barack Obama, while complimenting "Oroza's artwork [as] evok[ing] the series very well", with the "only gripe [of] that if you're going to set a story in Hell, make the surroundings more…hellish", concluding to state Go to Hell to have been "a decent stab at transferring the television characters to the printed page [with] the writing more or less match[ing] the tone of the show".

Collected editions

References

External links
 Rick and Morty Go to Hell at Oni Press

2020 graphic novels
Go to Hell
Oni Press titles
Sequel comics
Fiction about the Devil